ComLink, Germany is one of the earlier organizations involved in building networks for online communication of the alternative sector in Germany.

According to an essay titled  In the beginning there was FIDO, "Fidonet gateways were installed at WebNetworks (Canada), IGC (United States), GreenNet (UK), Laneta (Mexico), Comlink (Germany), Nordnet (Sweden) and Worknet/Sangonet (South Africa)."

External links
ComLink (in German)

Non-profit organisations based in Germany
Information technology organisations based in Germany